This article contains an overview of the year 1986 in the sport of athletics.

International Events
 Asian Games
 Balkan Games
 European Championships
 European Indoor Championships
 Commonwealth Games
 Goodwill Games
 World Junior Championships

World records

Men

Women

''Heike Drechsler (GDR) twice equals the world record in the women's 200 metres held by countrywoman Marita Koch since 1979-06-10, clocking 21.71 seconds on 1986-06-29 and 1986-08-29.

Men's Best Year Performers

100 metres

200 metres

400 metres

800 metres

1,500 metres

Mile

3,000 metres

5,000 metres

10,000 metres

Half Marathon

110m Hurdles

400m Hurdles

3,000m Steeplechase

High Jump

Long Jump

Triple Jump

Discus

Hammer

Shot Put

Javelin (old design)

Pole Vault

Decathlon

Women's Best Year Performers

100 metres

200 metres

400 metres

800 metres

1,500 metres

Mile

3.000 metres

5.000 metres

10,000 metres

Half Marathon

100m Hurdles

400m Hurdles

High Jump

Long Jump

Shot Put

Javelin (old design)

Heptathlon

Marathon

Year Rankings

Men

Women

National Champions

International Races

Births
 January 5 — Roman Novotný, Czech long jumper
 January 11 — Claudio Licciardello, Italian sprinter
 January 15 — Mariya Abakumova, Russian javelin thrower
 January 17 — Sherry Fletcher, Grenadian sprinter
 January 23 — Gelete Burka, Ethiopian middle distance  runner
 January 24 — Montell Douglas, British sprinter
 January 31 — Walter Dix, American sprinter
 February 11 — Bob Altena, Dutch decathlete
 April 1 — Yurika Nakamura, Japanese long-distance runner
 April 2 — Moses Aliwa, Ugandan long-distance runner
 April 4 — Evelyne Nganga, Kenyan long-distance runner
 April 29 — Ingus Janevics, Latvian race walker
 May 2 — Samuel Muturi Mugo, Kenyan long-distance runner
 May 16 — Eleni Artymata, Cypriot sprinter
 June 3 — Micah Kogo, Kenyan long-distance runner
 June 8 — Yadira Guamán, Ecuadorian race walker
 June 10 — Amr Ibrahim Mostafa Seoud, Egyptian sprinter
 June 27 — LaShawn Merritt, American sprinter
 July 3 — Robina Muqimyar, Afghan sprinter
 July 17 — Viktor Kuznyetsov, Ukrainian long jumper and triple jumper
 July 19 — Philes Ongori, Kenyan long-distance runner
 July 26 — Mattias Claesson, Swedish middle distance runner
 July 26 — Angela Moroşanu, Romanian sprinter
 July 28 — Nancy Wambui, Kenyan long-distance runner
 July 28 — Nickiesha Wilson, Jamaican hurdler
 August 3 — Fartun Abukar Omar, Somali athlete
 August 21 — Usain Bolt, Jamaican sprinter
 August 29 — Yerefu Birhanu, Ethiopian long-distance runner
 September 9 — Daniel Bailey, Antigua and Barbuda sprinter
 November 1 — Ksenija Balta, Estonian long jumper, sprinter and heptathlete
 November 10 — Samuel Wanjiru, Kenyan long-distance runner
 November 13 — Sergey Bakulin, Russian race walker
 November 21 — Aleksandra Zelenina, Moldovan long and triple jumper
 December 7 — Olga Mikhaylova, Russian race walker

Deaths
April 13 — Sulo Bärlund (75), Finnish shot putter (b. 1910)

References
 1986 Year Rankings
 Association of Road Racing Statisticians

 
Athletics (track and field) by year